A verbal noun or gerundial noun is a verb form that functions as a noun. An example of a verbal noun in English is 'sacking' as in the sentence "The sacking of the city was an epochal event" (sacking is a noun formed from the verb sack).

Verbal nouns are morphologically related to non-finite verb forms, but they are not themselves non-finite verbs. Non-finite verb forms are forms such as gerunds, infinitives and participles in English.

Some grammarians use the term "verbal noun" to cover verbal noun, gerund, and nominal infinitive. Some may use the term "gerund" to cover both verbal noun and gerund. "Verbal noun" has often been treated as a synonym for "gerund". This article includes only gerundial nouns within the scope of "verbal nouns", excluding gerunds, nominal infinitives, and nouns formed from verbs through derivational processes.

Outside of English, the term "verbal noun" may be used for 1) the citation form of verbs such as the masdar in Arabic and the verbal noun (berfenw) in Welsh or 2) declinable verb forms in Mongolian that can serve as predicates, comparable to participles but with a larger area of syntactic use

Types

Verbal or gerundial nouns, while being derived from verbs, behave grammatically entirely as nouns. For example, they do not take direct objects as verbs can, they may be preceded by the definite article, and they are modified by adjectives rather than adverbs. They may also be used as count nouns and pluralized. In English, verbal nouns are formed from verbs with the suffix -ing, that is, they take the same form as the gerund. Examples of such uses are given below:
 The killing of the president was an atrocious crime. (Verbal noun)
 Killing the president was an atrocious crime. (Gerund)
 The rapid erasing of the tape saved our bacon. (Verbal noun)
 Rapidly erasing the tape saved our bacon. (Gerund)

Note how the undergoer of killing and erasing is specified in the form of a prepositional phrase in the case of the verbal noun: of the president and of the tape. This is because killing and erasing function as nouns in this sentence and as such cannot take an object directly; instead the words president and tape (respectively) must be made object of the preposition of.

Verbs also may be nominalized through derivational processes, such as adding different suffixes, as in discovery from the verb discover, or by simple conversion, as with the noun love from the verb love. The formation of such deverbal nouns is not generally a productive process, that is, it cannot be indiscriminately applied to form nouns from any verb (for example, there is no noun *uncovery for the verb uncover). When they exist, such deverbal nouns often tend to replace the regularly formed verbal noun (as discovery is usually used rather than discovering, although the latter is still common as a gerund), or else a differentiation in meaning becomes established.

Other verb forms serving as nouns within the sentence include gerunds and infinitives. However, these are excluded from the scope of verbal nouns at this article.

Notes

Nouns by type